The Recopa Mineira, is a super cup tournament organized by the Federação Mineira de Futebol reuniting the winners of Troféu Inconfidência and the best placed team that is not from Belo Horizonte of each season of Campeonato Mineiro.

List of champions

Following is the list with all the champions of the Recopa Mineira.

Titles by team

References

External links
 FMF official website

Football competitions in Minas Gerais